Kire may refer to:

 Kireji, a category of words used in some types of Japanese poetry
 Kire language, a Ramu language of Papua New Guinea

People with the name 
 Easterine Kire (born 1959), poet and author
 Ezra Kire (born 1975), American musician
 Kire Grozdanov (born 1970), Macedonian football player for FK Pelister
 Kire Markoski (born 1995), Macedonian footballer player for AEL Limassol
 Kire Ristevski (born 1990), Macedonian footballer player for Vasas

See also 
 Kyre (disambiguation)